Triscuit is a brand name of snack crackers which take the form of square baked whole wheat wafers. Invented in 1900, a patent was granted in 1902 and the Shredded Wheat Company began production the next year in Niagara Falls, New York.

History 
The Shredded Wheat Company began producing Triscuit in 1903 in Niagara Falls, New York. The name Triscuit is believed by some to have come from a combination of the words electricity and biscuit rather than the common belief that "tri" is a reference to the three ingredients used (wheat, oil, and salt). At least one early advertisement boasted that Triscuits were "Baked by Electricity," claiming they were "the only food on the market prepared by this 1903 process." Each wafer measured , and remained that size for nearly twenty-one years. The ovens were then altered and the cracker size changed to  squares.

In 1928, the Shredded Wheat Company was purchased by Nabisco.

In 1935, producers began spraying the crackers with oil and adding salt. In 1984, additional flavor choices were introduced and the crackers were made crispier.

Overview

Triscuits are made from wheat, which is first cooked in water until it reaches about fifty percent moisture content, then tempered to allow the moisture to diffuse evenly in the grain. Slotted rollers form the grain into shredded wheat strands, which are then formed into webs. Several webs are stacked together and the still-moist stack is crimped to produce individual crackers. Oven baking then reduces the moisture content to five percent. The product is currently a  square.

References

External links

 

Nabisco brands
Brand name crackers
Products introduced in 1900
Mondelez International brands
Wheat